Two mass shootings have occurred in Wilkinsburg, Pennsylvania:

 2000 Wilkinsburg shooting, a racially motivated shooting spree that left three people dead and two injured
 2016 Wilkinsburg shooting, a mass shooting that left six people dead and three injured

See also 
 List of mass shootings in the United States